Carrie Ann Graf  (born 23 June 1967) is an Australian basketball coach. She competed in the WNBL as a player starting during 1983–1989, after which she attended RMIT. Graf has coached teams in the WNBL, WNBA and Australia's national team, and has been honoured for her contribution to basketball coaching.

Personal
After having earned a diploma of coaching from the Australian Coaching Council in 1991, Graf attended RMIT in Melbourne, Victoria, where she earned a Bachelor of Applied Science in Physical Education in 1992. She has several hobbies including listening to music and cooking.

Player
Graff started her professional basketball career as a 15-year-old with the Nunawading Spectres in the WNBL. In her first year of a seven-year stint with the Spectres from 1983 until 1989, she was named the Rookie of the Year and competed in the league Championships. She also played on the team for RMIT when she was a student there.

Coaching

Graf has coached women's basketball for over 20 years.

WNBL
In 2007 and 2008, Graf was named the WNBL Coach of the Year. As of 2010, she holds the most records in the WNBL for coaching wins, with over 200.

Sydney Flames
From 1993 to 1996, Graf coached the Sydney Flames. In 1993 and 1996, her teams finished first, and had only one loss alongside seventeen wins.

Canberra Capitals
Graf has coached the Canberra Capitals. She became the coach in 1999. She was the coach of the team in 2008–2009 when the team won the WNBL Championship.

WNBA
In 2004, Graf coached the Phoenix Mercury in the WNBA.  Prior to holding that position, she was an assistant coach with the team for four years in 1998, 1999, 2001 and 2003. She did not coach during the 2000 season because of her commitments to the Australian national team.

National team

Graf was an assistant coach for the national team that competed at the 1996 Summer Olympics, when the team won a bronze medal and when the team won a silver medal at the 2000 Summer Olympics.
Graf became the coach of the Australia women's national basketball team in December 2008. In 2009, she coached the Australian side that won the FIBA Oceania Championship.

Graf coached the Australian side that competed at and won the 2007 World University Games.

Recognition
In 1996, the Australian Coaching Council awarded Graf with the High Performance Coach Award and Young Coach of the Year Award. In 2000, Graf was honoured with being given an Australian Sports Medal for service to basketball. She has also been honoured by being named life member of the WNBL in 2006. ACTsport named her the Sportsperson of the year in 2008.

At the 2015 Australia Day Honours, Carrie was appointed a Member of the Order of Australia for her significant service to basketball, particularly as a coach, mentor and athlete, and to the community. She also awarded the Australian Sports Medal in 2000 in recognition of her results at the 2000 Olympics.

References

External links

 Carrie Graf: WNBL

1967 births
Living people
Australian people of German descent
Australian women's basketball players
Canberra Capitals
Members of the Order of Australia
Phoenix Mercury coaches
Recipients of the Australian Sports Medal
RMIT University alumni
Articles containing video clips
Place of birth missing (living people)
Australian women's basketball coaches
Seattle Storm coaches